Franny is a given name. It is generally a masculine name used as a nickname for Francis. The feminine form is Frannie. Notable people with the name include:

 Franny Armstrong (born 1972), British documentary film director
 Franny Beecher (1921–2014), American guitarist
 Franny Billingsley (born 1954), American children's fantasy novelist
 Franny Firth (born 1956), English footballer
 Franny Griffiths (born 1966), English keyboardist, producer and remixer
 Franny Moyle (born 1964), British television producer and author
 Franny Murray (1915–1998), American football halfback and punter 
 Franny Powell (born 1977), English footballer

See also
 The Benefactor (2015 film), 2015 American drama film with the working title Franny
 Franny, a short story from Franny and Zooey